Count  was a Japanese political figure of the late Meiji through early Shōwa periods, and served as President of the House of Peers in the Diet of Japan.

Biography
Yorinaga Matsudaira was the eighth son of Matsudaira Yoritoshi, the former daimyō of Matsuyama Domain in Shikoku. His mother, Chiyoko, was the daughter of Ii Naosuke and his wife was the daughter of Tokugawa Akitake, head of the Mito branch of the Tokugawa clan.

He attended the Gakushūin Peer’s School, and with the sponsorship of Ōkuma Shigenobu, graduated from the law school of Waseda University. district of Tokyo, as the eldest son of Tokugawa Iesato. In 1909 he became a member of the House of Peers, and continued to serve as a member every year (except for a hiatus between 1911–1914) until his death.

A strong supporter of education, he donated a large property in downtown Tokyo to create the Hongo Gakuin school.

In 1933, he was made Vice-President of the House of Peers, breaking with the precedent that only men with the rank of princes or marquis could service in the highest level positions. Four years later, when Fumimaro Konoe became Prime Minister of Japan, Yorinaga Matsudaira became the President of the House of Peers. He died while in office, and was posthumously awarded the Order of the Rising Sun, 1st class with Paulownia Flowers. His grave is at the Yanaka Cemetery in Tokyo. His nephew Yorihiro Matsudaira succeeded him in his peerage.

Yorinaga Matsudaira was also a noted collector of miniature bonsai, and served as honorary president of the Kofuku Bonsai Association. His collection eventually reached a thousand specimens, but many were destroyed after his death during World War II. Around two hundred specimens were preserved by his widow, who wrote an article for the 1953 Handbook on Dwarf Potted Trees issued by the Brooklyn Botanic Garden. In 1975, she published a book in Japanese,  Matsudaira Mame Bonsai Collection Album, which included photos of the couple.

Ancestry

References

Lebra, Sugiyama Takie. Above the Clouds: Status Culture of the Modern Japanese Nobility. University of California Press (1995). 
 Sims, Richard. Japanese Political History Since the Meiji Renovation 1868–2000. Palgrave Macmillan.

External links
Hongo Gakuin homepage (Japanese)
Yanaka Cemetery (Japanese)
Phoenix Bonsai Book

1874 births
1944 deaths
Waseda University alumni
Matsudaira clan
Members of the House of Peers (Japan)
Kazoku
Recipients of the Order of the Rising Sun with Paulownia Flowers